The women's 50m freestyle events at the 2022 World Para Swimming Championships were held at the Penteada Olympic Swimming Complex in Madeira between 12–18 June.

Medalists

Results

S3

S4

S5
Heats
12 swimmers from ten nations took part. The swimmers with the top eight times, regardless of heat, advanced to the final.

Final
The final was held on 12 June 2022.

S6

S7

S8

S9

S10
12 swimmers from 11 nations took part. The swimmers with the top eight times, regardless of heat, advanced to the final.

Final
The final was held on 12 June 2022.

S11
11 swimmers from 11 nations took part. The swimmers with the top eight times, regardless of heat, advanced to the final.

Final
The final was held on 12 June 2022.

S12

S13

References

2022 World Para Swimming Championships
2022 in women's swimming